David Grundie (1883-1937) was a pioneer Australian rugby league footballer who played in the 1910s.

Playing career
Grundie made his first grade debut in 1910 the same year that Newtown claimed their first ever premiership drawing 4–4 with South Sydney in the 1910 NSWRL grand final.  Newtown won the premiership due to the fact that they finished first during the regular season as minor premiers and were declared premiership winners.  Grundie played a further three seasons before retiring at the end of 1913.  Grundie also represented New South Wales on two occasions scoring one try.

References

External links

1883 births
1937 deaths
Australian rugby league players
Newtown Jets players
New South Wales rugby league team players
Rugby league locks
Rugby league players from New South Wales